Taima may refer to:

Places
 Taima, Nara, a former town in Japan
 Taima-dera, a temple in that town
 Taima-Taima, a Late Pleistocene archaeological site in Falcón, Venezuela
 Tayma, an oasis in Saudi Arabia

People
 Taimah (1790–1830), 19th-century Sauk leader, also known as Chief Tama
, Japanese water polo player

Other uses
 Taima (band), a Canadian musical duo and the album that they recorded, Taima
 Taima (whale), an orca from Sea World Orlando, Florida
 Taima, a duo consisting of Elisapie Isaac and Alain Auger
 Taima, an Augur hawk who is the live mascot of the Seattle Seahawks NFL team
 Taima, a Japanese word for cannabis
 Taima, a Japanese charm unrelated to cannabis
 Jingū taima, a famous variant of that charm

Japanese-language surnames